Edward Ernest Malin (23 October 1894 in Stoke Newington, London – 1 March 1977 in Ealing, London) was a British actor. He is perhaps most famous for portraying the mute and geriatric Walter in the sitcom Nearest and Dearest. He also had a memorable role in A Night to Remember (1958).

He was the youngest of seven children of John Malin (1850–1921), a purse maker in a fancy leather works, and Martha née Hackworthy (1855–1905). In 1911 aged 16 he was working as a tracer in a boiler works. During World War I he served in the Royal Navy, and became a Freemason in the Antioch Lodge No. 3271 in February 1918.

Edward Malin died on 1 March 1977, aged 82 at the King Edward Memorial hospital in Ealing, London. He had been resident at the actors' retirement home of Denville Hall, Northwood, Middlesex, for several years.

His funeral was held on 8 March 1977 at Golders Green Crematorium, London.

Selected filmography
 William Comes to Town (1948) - Toy Shop Man (uncredited)
 The Greed of William Hart (1948) - David Paterson
 Genevieve (1953) - Spectator (uncredited)
 The End of the Road (1954) - Nightwatchman
 The Million Pound Note (1954) - Clergyman at Belgrave Square (uncredited)
 A Kid for Two Farthings (1955) - Dog Man (uncredited)
 The Story of Esther Costello (1957) - Man in Irish pub (uncredited)
 The Silent Enemy (1958) - High Ranking British Navy Officer at Conference (uncredited)
 A Night to Remember (1958) - Dining Saloon Steward
 The Two-Headed Spy (1958) - Orderly (uncredited)
 Inn for Trouble (1960) - Old Charlie
 Operation Cupid (1960) - Smelly
 The Millionairess (1960) - Kabir's Patient (uncredited)
 Hair of the Dog (1962) - Sidney
 A Hard Day's Night (1964) - Hotel Waiter
 How to Steal a Million (1966) - Insurance Clerk
 Crooks and Coronets (1969) - 2nd Old Man (uncredited)
 The Bed-Sitting Room (1969) - Club Waiter
 Percy (1971) - Elderly patient
 Nearest and Dearest (1972) - Walter Tattersall

References

External links

1894 births
1977 deaths
English male television actors
People from Stoke Newington
Freemasons of the United Grand Lodge of England
Golders Green Crematorium